McBain may refer to:

People with the surname
 Diane McBain (1941–2022), American actress
 Ed McBain (1926–2005), American author and screenwriter
 Edward McBain (died c. 1930), Scottish footballer
 Jack McBain (born 2000), Canadian ice hockey player
 James William McBain (1882–1953), Canadian chemist
 Jamie McBain (born 1988), American ice hockey player
 Laurie McBain (born 1949), American writer
 Laurie McBain (footballer) (1907–1937), Scottish footballer
 Roy McBain (born 1974), Scottish footballer
 Scott McBain (born 1960), Scottish fiction author

In arts and entertainment
 McBain, character played by fictional actor Rainier Wolfcastle in the TV series The Simpsons
 McBain (film), 1991 action film

Other uses
 Clan MacBain, highland Scottish clan
 McBain, Michigan, city in Missaukee County in the U.S. state of Michigan

See also
McBaine (disambiguation)
McBane